William Dorrell may refer to:

 Billy Dorrell (1872–1953), English footballer
 William Dorrell (vegetarian) (1752–1846), American new religious leader of the Dorrellites